Lu Zhiyuan (born August 1964) is a Chinese politician, currently serving as party secretary of Qingdao and deputy party secretary of Shandong.

He was a representative of the 20th National Congress of the Chinese Communist Party. He was a delegate to the 12th National People's Congress. He is a representative of the 20th National Congress of the Chinese Communist Party and a member of the 20th Central Committee of the Chinese Communist Party.

Biography
Lu was born in Suide County, Shaanxi, in August 1964. In 1984, he entered Shaanxi College of Finance and Economics (now Xi'an Jiaotong University), where he majored in public finance. After graduating in 1988, he taught at Yan'an School of Finance and Economics.

In July 1993, Lu was assigned to Xi'an Municipal Finance Bureau, where he eventually becoming deputy director in November 2000. Lu became governor of Yanliang District, a district under the jurisdiction of Xi'an, in July 2002, and then party secretary, the top political position in the district, beginning in November 2005. In August 2008, he was appointed party secretary of Baqiao District, a position he held until June 2010. In August 2011, he was named acting mayor of Yulin, confirmed in January 2012. He was party secretary of Weinan in June 2015, in addition to serving as chairman of its People's Congress. He rose to become vice governor of Shaanxi in January 2018.

In September 2018, Lu was transferred to the coastal Liaoning province, where he was appointed head of the Organization Department of the CCP Liaoning Provincial Committee and was admitted to member of the Standing Committee of the CCP Liaoning Provincial Committee, the province's top authority.

In September 2021, Lu was transferred to east China's Shandong province. He was made party secretary of Qingdao and was admitted to member of the Standing Committee of the CCP Shandong Provincial Committee, the province's top authority. In June 2022, he was elevated to deputy party secretary of Shandong.

References

1964 births
Living people
People from Suide County
Xi'an Jiaotong University alumni
People's Republic of China politicians from Shaanxi
Chinese Communist Party politicians from Shaanxi
Members of the 20th Central Committee of the Chinese Communist Party
Delegates to the 12th National People's Congress